The South Texas Area Regional Soccer Complex is a 13 field soccer venue in San Antonio, Texas, United States.  It is used primarily for youth club soccer and adult league soccer. It is located in the former Longhorn Quarry, adjacent to Toyota Field, and Morgan's Wonderland, and near Heroes Stadium.

Toyota Field was originally owned and operated by S.O.A.R. Inc., a non-profit organization founded by Gordon Hartman. The complex was affiliated with the San Antonio Scorpions of the North American Soccer League, also owned by Hartman. On December 22, 2015, it was announced that Toyota Field and S.T.A.R. Soccer Complex were sold to the City of San Antonio and Bexar County.

See also
 San Antonio FC

References

External links
Official website

San Antonio Scorpions
Sports venues in San Antonio
2010 establishments in Texas
Soccer venues in Texas
Sports venues completed in 2010
San Antonio FC
Sports complexes in the United States